Daymeon Fishback (born February 28, 1978) is an American financial advisor and former professional basketball player.

High school career 
Fishback was born in Bowling Green, Kentucky and played at Greenwood High School in Bowling Green. He played at Greenwood for the late Larry Cheatham and Hall of Fame Coach Curtis Turley. Fishback recorded 2,214 points, 916 rebounds, 470 assists, 168 blocked shots and 163 steals at Greenwood. In 1996, he was named the Kentucky Mr. Basketball.

College career
Fishback played college basketball for the Auburn Tigers between 1996 and 2000. In 1999, Fishback helped Auburn win the SEC Regular Season Championship. Over 127 games in four seasons, he averaged 7.2 points, 3 rebounds, and an assist per game.

Professional career 
In 2000, Fishback signed with a YUBA League team Crvena zvezda for the 2000–01 season. Fishback was selected with the 76th overall pick in the 2001 NBDL draft by the Columbus Riverdragons, and with the 89th overall pick in the 2002 NBDL draft by the Roanoke Dazzle. Later, he played in France and Italy.

Post-playing career 
Fishback worked over a decade in Atlanta in the financial services industry, first at Merrill Lynch (2005–2013) and later at Morgan Stanley. Fishback has also worked as a color analyst for Fox Sports South and the Auburn Network.

In 2014, Fishback joined ESPN as an SEC Network game and studio analyst.

References

External links
 Daymeon Fishback at auburntigers.com
 Daymeon Fishback at usbasket.com

1978 births
Living people
African-American basketball players
American expatriate basketball people in France
American expatriate basketball people in Italy
American expatriate basketball people in Serbia
American financial businesspeople
American men's basketball players
Auburn Tigers men's basketball players
Basketball players from Kentucky
ESPN people
KK Crvena zvezda players
Merrill (company) people
Morgan Stanley employees
Shooting guards
Small forwards
Sportspeople from Bowling Green, Kentucky